The Malaysian alternative federal budget for the 2016 fiscal year was launched by Pakatan Harapan on 21 October 2015, two days before the Malaysian Budget Day, as a response to the government's federal budget.

Areas of direction
Some of the key items in the alternative budget were:
 Implementing the capital gains tax since this is also being implemented in 127 countries, including all European countries which are part of the OECD.
 Implementing the inheritance tax since many OECD members already implemented.
 Restructuring of 1Malaysia Development Berhad (1MDB) by putting the firm into administration and prosecuting wrongdoers.
 Separation of Prime Minister and Finance Minister portfolios to avoid excessive concentration of power held by one individual.
 Support extension of Zeti Akhtar Aziz's term as Bank Negara Malaysia governor by two more years.
 For a short term, keeping Goods and Services Tax (GST) system by zero-rating all items to mitigate inflation.
 To set up a petroleum endowment fund for East Malaysians.
 The Kuala Lumpur-Singapore high speed rail (HSR) project funds will instead be reallocated to building a rail network in Sabah and Sarawak.
 Offset the loss of GST income by making MYR30 billion in savings by stamping out "wastage and corruption", and also by shutting down several state-linked corporations.
 Reducing PETRONAS dividend to MYR20 billion.
 Revamping cash handouts such as Bantuan Rakyat 1Malaysia (BR1M) to be conditional on employment and school attendance; the low-income parents must work and send their children to schools.
 Focusing more on agriculture because the country's agricultural policies were “backward, if compared with other countries”; it is necessary to give the subsidies directly to the farmers and also provide a subsidy for the price of rice.
 Parliamentary oversight of sovereign wealth funds for greater accountability, accountability and full independence of regulators which include the Malaysian Anti-Corruption Commission (MACC), Attorney-General of Malaysia, Bank Negara Malaysia and Parliament of Malaysia.
 Focus in bridging the economic activities' gap in Peninsular Malaysia and those in Sabah and Sarawak.

Total revenues and spending

Revenues

(In million MYR)

Expenditures by object
These tables are in million MYR.

Reactions

See also
 2016 Malaysian federal budget

References

Malaysian budgets
13th Parliament of Malaysia
2015 in Malaysian politics
Pakatan Harapan alternative federal
2015 in Malaysian law